Gerow may refer to:

People
Notable people with the surname of Gerow include:
Aaron Gerow (born c. 1964), American historian of Japanese cinema
Aleksandyr Gerow (1919–1997), Bulgarian poet and writer
Brenda Gerow (1960–1981), American murder victim, previously known as Pima County Jane Doe
Charlie Gerow (contemporary), American political consultant
Lee S. Gerow (1891–1982), United States Army General, brother of Leonard T. Gerow
Leonard T. Gerow (1888–1972), United States Army General, brother of Lee S. Gerow
Richard Oliver Gerow (1885–1976), American Roman Catholic bishop
See also
Thomas Gerow Murphy (1883–1971), Canadian politician
Al Jarreau (1940–2017), American singer and musician

Places
Dam Gerow Band, a village in Hormozgan Province, Iran
Gerdeh Gerow, a village in West Azerbaijan Province, Iran
Garow (disambiguation), various places in Iran